Mary Patterson Elkinton Nitobe (1857-1938) was an American-Quaker, the wife of the Japanese economist Nitobe Inazō.

Life
Mary Patterson Elkinton was born in 1857 to a prominent Quaker family in Philadelphia. She met Nitobe Inazō in Baltimore, and against the wishes of both their families, married him in 1891. She had two daughters with him, one died in infancy, and the other, Eva Oral Nitobe, lived to full adulthood.

Living in Japan, which she considered her home, she contributed to educational reform, worked to improve US-Japan relations, advocated internationalism and helped to establish several schools. She helped her husband in the writing of his 1899 book, Bushidô, The Soul of Japan. When her husband served in the League of Nations at Geneva she was active in international circles. After they returned to Tokyo in the late 1920s, she found Japanese militarism in conflict with her Quakerism.

After her husband's death she edited his reminiscences, and continued to live in Japan. She died on 22 September 1938.

Papers of both Mary and Inzo Nitobe are held at Swarthmore College.

Works
 (ed. with introduction and comments) Reminiscences of childhood in the early days of modern Japan by Nitobe Inazō, 1934

References

1857 births
1938 deaths
19th-century Quakers
American emigrants to Japan
American Quakers
Japanese people of American descent
People from Philadelphia